Āwhitu Regional Park is a regional park situated on the Awhitu Peninsula, just south of Manukau Heads on the western side of the Manukau Harbour. It is situated in Franklin in Auckland in New Zealand's North Island, and is administered by Auckland Council.

History

English immigrants John and Sarah Brook settled on the Āwhitu Peninsula in 1875, building a homestead for their family in 1878. The Brook family ran a sheep and cattle farm on the property, until it was sold in 1971 to become a regional park.

Biodiversity

The regional park is a mix of grassland, exotic confider trees and wetlands. In 1985, a lake was created in the park, which became home to Eleocharis sphacelata, a native edge species.

References 

Franklin Local Board Area
Parks in the Auckland Region
Regional parks of New Zealand
Tourist attractions in the Auckland Region